Peter the Great (Пётр Великий, Petr Veliky) (1672–1725) was a Russian monarch.

Peter the Great may also refer to:

Monarchs 
 Peter III of Aragon (1239–1285)

Ships 
 Russian ironclad Petr Veliky, an 1872 ironclad turret ship
 Russian battlecruiser Pyotr Velikiy, commissioned in 1998
 , a Soviet passenger-ship in service 1946–47 and 1949–73

Film and television
 Peter the Great (1910 film), a Russian short film
 Peter the Great (1922 film), a German silent historical film
 Peter the Great (1937 film), a Soviet two-part historical biographical film
 Peter the Great (miniseries), an American television mini-series

Other uses
 Peter the Great (horse), an American Standardbred horse
 Pierre le Grand (pirate) ('Peter the Great'), a 17th century buccaneer
 Peter the Great (Fabergé egg), a jewelled Easter egg